Great Stoke is a suburb of the city of Bristol, in the South Gloucestershire district, in the county of Gloucestershire, England. It is part of the town of Bradley Stoke and the village of Stoke Gifford.

Areas of Bristol
Villages in South Gloucestershire District